The Zastava P25, nicknamed the Dark Lady, is a blowback-operated, single-action, semi-automatic pocket pistol chambered in .25 ACP. The P25 is manufactured by Zastava Arms of Serbia. It features a two-stage safety mechanism whereas pulling the hammer into the first position blocks both the trigger and the hammer. The pistol frame is made of aluminum alloy and the barrel is made of alloy steel, while the handgrips are usually made of walnut or polymer materials. The P25 is aimed extensively at the civilian market as a self-defense weapon due to its concealability, but is somewhat less favorable compared to the M57, M88 and CZ 99 pistols due to its small caliber.

Its production has been likely discontinued as it is no longer listed on the Zastava Arms website.

References

External links

.25 ACP semi-automatic pistols
Semi-automatic pistols of Serbia
Zastava Arms
Serbian design